Engelhard is a census-designated place (CDP) and fishing community in Lake Landing Township on the mainland of Hyde County, North Carolina, United States. It has access to Pamlico Sound. As of the 2010 census it had a population of 445.

History
Inkwell and Wynne's Folly are listed on the National Register of Historic Places.

Geography
Engelhard is in eastern Hyde County along U.S. Route 264, which leads northeast  to Manteo and west  to Belhaven.

The community is at the head of Far Creek, a small tidal inlet of Pamlico Sound.

Demographics

2020 census

As of the 2020 United States census, there were 374 people, 120 households, and 109 families residing in the CDP.

Climate

This region experiences hot and wet summers with rainy days. According to the Köppen Climate Classification system, Engelhard has a humid subtropical climate (Köppen Cfa).

There are cool winters during which intense rainfall occurs. 

Snow in Engelhard is possible in winter months.

Education
The local school is Mattamuskeet School of Hyde County Schools.

In the de jure segregation era, the grade school for black students was, by the 1960s, Davis School, a consolidation of earlier such schools, in Engelhard. The high school for black students was Hyde County Training School in Sladesville. The high school for white students was East Hyde School.

BHM Regional Library operates the Engelhard Library.

References

Census-designated places in Hyde County, North Carolina
Populated coastal places in North Carolina